Polystepha pilulae, the oak leaf gall midge, is a species of gall midge in the family Cecidomyiidae. It is found in eastern North America.

Description of the gall 
The larvae of this species of midge form circular galls that can be flat or convex. These form on the upper surface of oak leaves of the red oak group (Quercus sect. Lobatae), between the veins. The galls are thick-walled and reddish-brown in colour. They are 3 to 4 mm in diameter.

References

Further reading

 
 

Cecidomyiinae
Articles created by Qbugbot
Insects described in 1892
Diptera of North America

Taxa named by William Beutenmuller
Gall-inducing insects